Craterellus is a genus of generally edible fungi similar to the closely related chanterelles, with some new species recently moved from the latter to the former. Both groups lack true gills on the underside of their caps, though they often have gill-like wrinkles and ridges.

General 
The three most common species, Cr. cornucopioides, Cr. lutescens and Cr. tubaeformis, are gathered commercially and, unlike Cantharellus, can be easily preserved by drying.

Molecular phylogenetics have been applied to the problem of discriminating between Craterellus and Cantharellus genera.  Results indicate that the presence of a hollow stipe may be a synapomorphy (a trait corresponding to the evolutionary relationship) which reliably identifies Craterellus species.  Cr. cornucopioides appears to be a single polymorphic species, while Cr. tubaeformis may be two separate genetic groups separated by geography.

Definition of the genus 

The genera Craterellus and Cantharellus have always been recognized as closely related.  The whole group may be recognized by their lack of division into cap and stipe, and their rudimentary or missing gills ("false gills").  Originally Cantharellus was defined by Fries in 1821 to mean all these species together and then in 1825 Persoon separated some species off to create the Craterellus group, with Cr. cornucopioides as type species.  Since then some authorities have tried to merge the two genera again, but DNA studies now indicate that (with recent changes) each genus is monophyletic, and so they are likely to remain separate.

In the past Craterellus was distinguished on the basis that 
the fruiting body had a hollow stipe, generally being funnel-shaped, and
there were no clamp connections.

But phylogenetic DNA work starting with the 2000 paper of Dahlman et al. has shown that some species traditionally placed in Cantharellus (C. tubaeformis, C. ignicolor and C. lutescens) really belong in Craterellus, and this means that the second distinguishing rule is no longer valid.  On the other hand, the first rule holds up well.

Species

The taxonomy of these fungi is in a state of flux (particularly due to DNA analysis) and many earlier names are now disputed.  The following table gives some of the most important ones.  Numerous species of Cantharellus have at times been classified under Craterellus, but these are mostly excluded from the table.  See also the cladogram at right for a portrayal of the relationships between the species based on recent evidence.

References

External links

Cantharellales
Edible fungi
Agaricomycetes genera
Taxa named by Christiaan Hendrik Persoon